Gurwalia is a village in Kushinagar district in Uttar Pradesh state of India. Gurwalia is famous for  Ravan Sanhita. Late Pandit Bageshwari pathak was a very famous astrologer who died in 2003. After his death the astrology center is headed by his son Kamakhya Prakash Pathak.
Gurwalia is also a very upcoming hub for education. It has 1 degree college , bageshwari rambasi degree college , 2 intermediate colleges and 1 CBSE Board affiliated school S.P.Public School.These institutions are headed by educationist DR.Shakti Prakash Pathak, who has also been awarded by Chief Minister on teachers day.

References

External links 
 Villageinfo.in
 गुरवलिया में है हस्तलिखित रावण संहिता at jagran.com
 जानिये क्‍यों महत्‍वपूर्ण है रावण संहिता at hindi.oneindia.com

  पिता की जलाई लौ को बनाया दीपक at jagran.com

डॉ शक्ति प्रकाश पाठक मुख्यमंत्री द्वारा सम्मानित at jagran.com

रावण संहिता के जरिए बताते हैं भाग्य at amarujala.com

शिक्षक कभी सेवानिवृत्त नहीं होता, सतत चलता है शिक्षण at jagran.com

रावण संहिता से बताते हैं फल at jagran.com

Villages in Kushinagar district